Bathinda Rural Assembly constituency (Sl. No.: 93) is a Punjab Legislative Assembly constituency in Bathinda district, Punjab state, India. Its previous name was Pakka Kalan assembly constituency.

Members of the Legislative Assembly 
 2012: Darshan Singh Kotfatta (SAD)
 2007: Makhan Singh (Congress)
 2002: Gurjant Singh Kuttiwal (CPI)
 1997: Makhan Singh (Congress)
 1992: Baldev Singh (Congress)

Election Results

2022

2017

Previous Results

References

External links
  

Assembly constituencies of Punjab, India
Bathinda district